Sophie Louise Holland is a Welsh actress trained at the London Academy of Performing Arts. She made her acting debut as part of a dance show at the Drury Lane Theatre, London aged 17. She received the Cinequest Film Festival Audience Award 2007 in California for her performance in Nobody the Great, written and directed by Screen Nation Award winner Kara Miller. Her first on-screen role was that of Ally in the Warner Brothers film Forest of the Damned with Tom Savini and Richard Cambridge.

Filmography

Film

Television

External links
 

Welsh stage actresses
Welsh film actresses
Living people
Year of birth missing (living people)